Kissyfur is an American animated children's television series which aired on NBC. It was produced by Jean Chalopin and Andy Heyward and created by Phil Mendez for DIC Animation City. The series was based on a half-hour NBC special called Kissyfur: Bear Roots and was followed by three more specials until its Saturday morning debut. The show ran for two seasons between 1986 to 1988.

The show follows the adventures of Gus and Kissyfur, a father and son bear who had joined the circus. One day, the circus train derails and the bears escape to a new life in the swamps of Paddlecab County, somewhere in the Southeastern United States. There, they protect the local swamp's inhabitants from the hungry, bumbling alligators Floyd and Jolene. Kissyfur and his father use the skills they have acquired from the human world to create a boat tour business transporting other animals and their products down the river. As of 2022, Kissyfur is one of the few NBC productions not in the Peacock streaming service.

Characters

Adults
 Gus (voiced by Ed Gilbert) — Kissyfur's widowed father, who owns a Paddlecab company, taxiing animals from one side of the swamp to the other. He can be a bit goofy at times, but is a very good father. He's the only one of all the swamp parents who can take on both alligators, Floyd and Jolene, and run them off.
 Miss Emmy Lou (voiced by Russi Taylor) — a blue bear who wears a flower behind one ear. She's the schoolteacher in the swamp and has a Southern accent. She is also an excellent cook and has a sister named Jenny Lou and a cousin named Ernie. She is sweet on Gus and serves as his love interest.
 Charles (voiced by Lennie Weinrib) — a warthog and Lennie's stubborn father, Charles thinks he has everything figured out most of the time, but is usually more brawn than brains. He is strong enough to take on Jolene, but not Floyd. He is one of the only three adults to be captured and almost eaten by the gators, along with the Cackle Sisters.
 Howie (voiced by Frank Welker) – a mocking bird who can throw his voice and can mimic anything and everyone. This talent often gets him into trouble.
 Uncle Shelby (voiced by Frank Welker) - a wise turtle who is the elder of the swamp.
 The Cackle Sisters (portrayed by Russi Taylor and Frank Welker) — two chicken sisters named Bessie and Claudette. Bessie talks and is very prim and proper, while Claudette just clucks, usually agreeing with whatever her sister says. They are usually seen keeping watch for Floyd and Jolene on a large, floating buoy and are quick to ring a bell whenever they catch sight of them. They are two of the only three adults to be captured and almost eaten by the gators, along with Charles.
 Floyd (voiced by Stu Rosen) — an alligator who, along with His sister, Jolene, is always hatching a plan to capture the swamp cubs so they can eat them for dinner (though if the opportunity arises, they may sometimes go after the adults, as well). He often makes dimwitted remarks.
 Jolene (voiced by Terence McGovern) — a hot-tempered alligator who wears a red wig. She and Floyd are always trying to capture the swamp cubs so they can eat them for dinner (though if the opportunity arises, they may sometimes go after the adults, as well). She would be considered the brains between the two, but not by much. She has a low tolerance for Floyd's dimwittedness, which usually results in her smacking him with her wig.
 Flo (voiced by Marilyn Lightstone) — a smug buzzard.

Swamp cubs
 Kissyfur (voiced by R.J. Williams and later Max Meier) — Gus's son, the leader of the swamp cubs, and the title character of the series. He and his father used to work in a circus, along with Kissyfur's mother, who died in a performance accident. After the circus train, they were on crashed, Kissyfur and his father ran into Paddlecab County, and that's where they have been living since. He is an eight-year-old bear cub who loves to pretend and occasionally gets into trouble with the rest of the cubs. His name is a malapropism of the name Christopher as Phil Mendez named the character after his son.
 Stuckey (voiced by Stu Rosen) — an indigo porcupine who is very gloomy. He talks slowly and is the quiet one of the group. He is also Duane's best friend and is the only swamp cub whose family is not seen. According to the revised writer's bible, Stuckey was an orphan found on a road, and adopted by an unseen family of possums. He is also the only swamp cub not to speak in the pilot.
 Beehonie (voiced by Russi Taylor) — a white bunny who has a crush on Kissyfur, on account of the fact that she is the same age as he is. She is the only female swamp cub and tends to act as the voice of reason at times.
 Duane (voiced by Neil Ross) — an eleven-year-old pig who loves to clean, similar to Felix Unger of The Odd Couple, with the manners and attitude of Truman Capote. He is Stuckey's best friend.
 Toot (voiced by Russi Taylor) — a three-year-old beaver, Toot is the youngest of the swamp cubs. He looks up to and idolizes Kissyfur. He is Kissyfur's best friend. His nose changes from pink to black in season two.
 Lennie (voiced by Lennie Weinrib) — Charles's son, Lennie is ten years old and was the leader of the swamp cubs prior to Kissyfur's arrival (after which leadership transferred to him without much explanation). He enjoys being bossy and pushing the other cubs around, although despite this, he does like and care about his friends. He often refers to Kissyfur as "Sissyface".
 Ralph (voiced by Susan Silo) — a young packrat, the same age as Kissyfur. sort of the rebel of the cubs.
 Flip (voiced by Tress MacNeille) — a tricky chameleon that can change colors. In season 1, he had a red color for the top of His body, yellow with red spots in the middle, and blue with a light-blue spot and in between. In season 2, he has a green body, with a yellow stomach, but can still change colors.
 Donna (voice by Russi Taylor) — Miss Emmy Lou's niece. Her only appearance is in the second special, "The Birds and the Bears".

Episodes

Specials (1985–1986)
Four specials aired between 1985 and 1986.

Season 1 (1986)

Season 2 (1988)

International release
The show also aired on the BBC (as part of its But First This lineup becoming the only cartoon made for the BBC during that block), TCC and Nickelodeon in the UK, TRT in Turkey, ATV World in Hong Kong, SABC1 and SABC2 in South Africa, TVP in Poland, TV3 in New Zealand, Sirasa TV and Channel One (formerly MTV) in Sri Lanka, SBT in Brazil, MediaCorp Channel 5 and Prime 12 in Singapore, JBC, SSTV (Super Supreme Television) and Television Jamaica in Jamaica, RTB in Brunei, Namibian Broadcasting Corporation in Namibia, GMA Network in the Philippines, Armed Forces Network in Germany, Canal+ in France, Israeli Educational Television in Israel, NCRV in the Netherlands and Seven Network in Australia.

Reception
Charles Solomon of the Los Angeles Times observed that "the lush backgrounds and some of the character designs owe a lot to Walt Kelly's "Pogo"; all that's missing is the imagination, wit and draftsmanship". He criticized that "the directors time the comedy material so badly that the jokes land with a thud".
In 2014, Rob Bricken of io9 included Kissyfur in his list of a "dozen '80s cartoons that don't deserve to be remembered at all, let alone fondly".

References

External links
 

1986 American television series debuts
1988 American television series endings
1980s American animated television series
American children's animated adventure television series
Animated television series about bears
DC Comics titles
NBC original programming
Television series by DIC Entertainment
Television series by Saban Entertainment
Television series by Universal Television
Fictional anthropomorphic characters
English-language television shows